The Pieve di Santo Stefano is a late-Gothic-style, Roman Catholic parish church located on via Pieve, 4 in the frazione of Candelara of Pesaro, region of Marche, Italy. 

A church at the site is documented since the year 1000, but the church is the result of a 15th-century reconstruction. Further reconstructions were performed over the centuries. The portal, planned in a Renaissance style, is incomplete. Among the works inside are: 
Madonna, Child, and Saints (1555) fresco by Ottaviano Zuccari
Madonna, Child, and Saints (16th-century) attributed to Pompeo Morganti
Madonna and Child, and Saints (16th-century) by il Rondolino
Madonna in Glory and Saints (18th-century) Giovanni Giacomo Pandolfi
Madonna of the Rosary (1628-1630) by Simone Cantarini and Claudio Ridolfi

References

Roman Catholic churches in Pesaro
Gothic architecture in le Marche
15th-century Roman Catholic church buildings in Italy